Wasaga Beach Transit is a public transportation system for the resort town of Wasaga Beach, Ontario, Canada. It was formerly operated by Georgian Coach Lines from 2008 to 2014 and contracted to Sinton-Landmark using municipally-owned buses. Service expanded from one route which was started in July, 2008 to two in the summer of 2009, because the bus system grew faster than anyone expected. On August 6, 2019, the Wasaga Beach Transit was assumed by the Simcoe County, admitting it into the Simcoe County LINX system. This change also provides transit service to Barrie.

Services for Wasaga Beach Transit occur in a loop from the Wasaga Stars Arena to the Real Canadian Superstore every hour from 7 AM to 7 PM. Buses serve the loop eastbound and westbound. Transit service in Wasaga Beach is operated by Georgian Coach Lines, using town-owned buses, under the name Wasaga Beach Transit. The service was started with one route in July 2008, and quickly expanded to two routes in the summer of 2009.  Services for Wasaga Beach Transit occur in a loop from the Wasaga Stars Arena in the east to the Real Canadian Superstore in the west every hour from 7 am to 9 pm. There is a transit link between Wasaga Beach and Collingwood that operates on a continuous loop.

When the service was introduced, the town of Wasaga Beach created a contest to help design the logo for the transit service. A logo depicting a sun and a wave with the slogan 'Ride the Wave' was introduced as the contest winner.

Bus routes
Route 1 - Archer to Shopping Centre (45th Street)
Route 2 - Wasaga Stars Arena to 70th Street 

The town is also served by two Simcoe County LINX routes - Wasaga Beach to Collingwood or Barrie (no free transfers to/from Wasaga Beach Transit)

See also

 Public transport in Canada

References

External links
 

Bus transport in Simcoe County
Public transport in Simcoe County
Transit agencies in Ontario